Fistball World Championships are an international association fistball competition contested by the senior national teams of the members of the International Fistball Association (IFA) since 1968 for men and 1992 for women. In additional, under-18 Fistball World Championships have been hosted for male youth since 2003 and female youth since 2006.

Men’s Fistball World Championships

Results

Overall Medal Count

Women’s Fistball World Championships

Results

Overall Medal Count

Male U18 Youth Fistball World Championships

Results

Overall Medal Count

Female U18 Youth Fistball World Championships

Results

Overall Medal Count

See also 
 Fistball European Championships
 Asia-Pacific Fistball Championships

External links 
 International Fistball Association IFA (German, English)
 2011 Men's Fistball World Championships Official Website (German, English)
 2015 Men's Fistball World Championships Official Website (German, English, Spanish, Portuguese)
 2014 Women's Fistball World Championships Official Website (German, English)

References 

 
Fistball
World championships